The Madhyama Āgama (Sanskrit; Chinese: Zhong ahan jing) is an early Indian Buddhist text, of which currently only a Chinese translation is extant (Taishō Tripiṭaka 26). The title means "Middle Collection." It is one of the four Āgamas of the Sanskritic Sūtra Piṭaka located in the Chinese Buddhist Canon and contains 222 discourses in 18 chapters. Its Pali equivalent, the Majjhima Nikaya, contains 152 discourses in 15 chapters.

Origins and history 

The earliest Chinese translation of the agama dates to 397–398 C.E.  P.V. Bapat believes the original source for the Chinese translation was in a form of Prakrit, closer to Pali than Sanskrit. The text is believed to be from the Sarvāstivāda tradition.

Parallels in Pali Canon

There are numerous parallels between the discourses in the Madhyama Āgama and discourses in the Sutta Piṭaka.

English translations

Translation of the Madhyama Āgama into English began in 2006 with Marcus Bingenheimer as chief editor and Bhikkhu Analayo and Rodney S. Bucknell as co-editors. The first of three volumes was published in 2013

References

Sources

External links
The Madhyama Āgama, or Middle-length Discourses at BDK America

Agamas
Tripiṭaka